Air Canada Rouge serves the following destinations as of June 2022:

Map

List

See also
List of Air Canada destinations
List of Jazz Aviation destinations

References

Air Canada rouge
Air Canada